Franz Christian Palm (born May 15, 1948) is a Belgian economist. He is a Professor of Econometrics at Maastricht University. He was also appointed Academy Professor in Econometrics by Royal Netherlands Academy of Arts and Sciences (KNAW) in 2005. He became a foreign member of the KNAW in 2000.

Palm earned his doctorate from the Université catholique de Louvain in 1975, with a dissertation on “Time Series Analysis and Simultaneous Equation Systems with Macroeconomic Applications.” He conducted most of the research that went into this thesis at the University of Chicago (1972–74), together with Arnold Zellner.

References

External links
 Website at Maastricht University

1948 births
Living people
Belgian economists
Université catholique de Louvain alumni
Academic staff of Maastricht University
Members of the Royal Netherlands Academy of Arts and Sciences
Fellows of the American Statistical Association